887 Naval Air Squadron (887 NAS) was a Naval Air Squadron of the Royal Navy's Fleet Air Arm.

The squadron formed at Lee-on-Solent in May 1942 as a Fleet Fighter squadron with 6 Fulmar IIs. In April 1943 the squadron, now equipped with 9 Seafire IICs, embarked on HMS Unicorn for Malta convoy duties, and subsequently taking part in the landings at Salerno in September 1943. In October 1943 the squadron joined the 24th Naval Fighter Wing, and embarked on HMS Indefatigable in July 1944 to provide fighter cover during the Operation Mascot dive-bombing attack on the German battleship Tirpitz in Kaa Fjord, North Norway.

In October 1944 the squadron operated from HMS Implacable. The squadron embarked again on HMS Indefatigable in November for the Far East, and took part in the attack on the oil refineries at Palembang, Sumatra in January 1945. It subsequently was involved in strikes on the Sakashima Gunto islands.

June 1945 was spent at Schofields, the squadron re-embarking on HMS Indefatigable in July and was involved in strikes around Tokyo just before VJ-Day, with 887 squadron Seafire NN212 coded "112/S" flown by Sub Lt GJ Murphy shooting down 2 Japanese A6M in flames, at Odaki Bay on 15 August 1945, whilst escorting Avengers to Kisarazu airfield, 30 miles south of Tokyo. The ship and squadrons finally returned to the UK in March 1946.

References

800 series Fleet Air Arm squadrons
Military units and formations established in 1942
Military units and formations of the Royal Navy in World War II